The 1925 CCNY Lavender football team was an American football team that represented the City College of New York (CCNY) as an independent during the 1925 college football season. In its second season under head coach Harold J. Parker, CCNY compiled a 2–5 record, was shut out by five of seven opponents, and was outscored by all opponents by a total of 171 to 28.  The team played its home games at Lewisohn Stadium in New York City.

Schedule

References

CCNY
CCNY Beavers football seasons
CCNY Lavender football